Rita Uchenna Nkem Dominic Nwaturuocha  (born 12 July 1975) is a Nigerian actress. In 2012, Rita Dominic won the Africa Movie Academy Award for Best Actress in a Leading Role.

Early life
Rita Dominic is a multiple award-winning Nollywood actress, producer, model, television personality, investor, a philanthropist and co-founder of the Audrey Silva Company. She has been regarded as one of the best industrious actress in Nollywood and also one of the highest-paid actresses in Nigeria. 
Rita Dominic is currently a GLO Ambassador and the CEO of Rita Dominic Productions.

Dominic is a member of the Royal Nwaturuocha family of Aboh Mbaise local government area in Imo State. Rita Dominic is the youngest of four children. Her late parents were health care professionals, her father was a medical doctor and mother a nursing officer. Dominic attended the prestigious Federal Government College, Ikot Ekpene, Akwa Ibom State, Nigeria, before heading to the University of Port Harcourt, where she graduated with a BA (Honours) Degree in Theatre Arts in 1999.

Personal life 
In 2019, Dominic, via her Instagram page, called for the prosecution of 28-year-old Idris Ebiloma. Dominic accused Ebiloma of raping 15-month year old Khloe, on 31 August 2016 at the victim's home in Asokoro, Abuja.

On 5 April 2022, Dominic announced her engagement to Daily Times publisher, Fidelis Anosike, for the marriage slated for 18 and 19 April. On 19 April 2022, Dominic and Anosike did their traditional wedding in Imo State, Rita Dominic's state of origin.

In November 2022, Rita Dominic held her white wedding with Fidelis Anosike in England, in attendance were Kate Henshaw, Chioma Chukwuka and others

Career
Rita Dominic started performing as a child, appearing in school plays and children's television shows in Imo State. In 1998, she starred in her first movie, A Time to Kill.  Over the years. She produced a lot of movies. The therapist, light in the dark, bound, the blindspot and Desecration. Over the years, she has gotten a number of honours. She also won the top actress in a movie titled" The meeting" in the Year 2013 and 2017. She won the best actress in Tv series. Rita Dominic won the City People Awards in 2004 as the Most Outstanding Actress. Rita Dominic has starred in over 100 Nollywood productions.

Filmography

Awards and nominations

See also 
 List of Nigerian actresses

References

External links

 Official website
 

1975 births
Living people
Best Actress Africa Movie Academy Award winners
Igbo actresses
University of Port Harcourt alumni
Actresses from Imo State
20th-century Nigerian actresses
21st-century Nigerian actresses
People from Mbaise
Nigerian film producers
Nigerian female models
Nigerian television personalities
Nigerian philanthropists
Nigerian chief executives
Nigerian businesspeople
Nigerian women in business